John Hamilton McWhorter V (born October 6, 1965) is an American linguist with a specialty in creole languages, sociolects, and Black English. He is currently an associate professor of linguistics at Columbia University, where he also teaches American studies and music history. He has authored of a variety of books on race relations and African-American culture.

Early life and education
McWhorter was born and raised in Philadelphia. His father, John Hamilton McWhorter IV (1927–1996), was a college administrator, and his mother, Schelysture Gordon McWhorter (1937–2011), taught social work at Temple University. He attended Friends Select School in Philadelphia and after tenth grade was accepted to Simon's Rock College where he earned an AA degree. Later, he attended Rutgers University and received a BA degree in French in 1985. He obtained an MA degree in American Studies from New York University and a PhD degree in linguistics in 1993 from Stanford University.

Career
McWhorter taught linguistics at Cornell University from 1993 to 1995, then became an associate professor of linguistics at the University of California, Berkeley, from 1995 until 2003. He left that position to become a senior fellow at the Manhattan Institute, a conservative think tank. Since 2008, he has taught linguistics, American studies, and classes in the core curriculum program at Columbia University. As Columbia's Department of Linguistics had been dissolved in 1989, McWhorter was initially assigned to the Department of English and Comparative Literature. The Program of Linguistics (including a revived undergraduate major as of 2021) is currently housed in the Department of Slavic Languages.

McWhorter is the professor of the courses "The Story of Human Language"; "Understanding Linguistics: The Science of Language"; "Myths, Lies and Half-Truths About English Usage"; "Language Families of the World"; and "Language From A to Z" in the series The Great Courses, produced by the Teaching Company.

McWhorter has written for Time, The Wall Street Journal, The Chronicle of Higher Education, The Washington Post, The New Republic, Politico, Forbes, The Chicago Tribune, The New York Daily News, City Journal, The New York Sun, The New Yorker, The Root, The Daily Beast, and CNN. He is a contributing editor at The Atlantic and, after writing op-eds for The New York Times for several years, became an Opinion columnist there in 2021. He hosts the Lexicon Valley podcast — for Slate from 2016 to 2021, and currently for Booksmart Studios. He was contributing editor at The New Republic from 2001 to 2014. McWhorter has published a number of books on linguistics and on race relations, including Power of Babel: A Natural History of Language, Our Magnificent Bastard Tongue: The Untold History of English, Doing Our Own Thing: The Degradation of Language and Music and Why You Should, Like, Care, and Losing the Race: Self-Sabotage in Black America.

Linguistics 

Much of McWhorter's academic work is concerned with creole languages and their relationship to other languages, often focusing on the Suriname creole language Saramaccan. His work has expanded to a general investigation of the effect of second-language acquisition on a language. He argues that languages naturally tend toward complexity and irregularity, a tendency that is reversed only by adults acquiring the language, and creole formation is simply an extreme example of the latter. As examples, he cites English, Mandarin Chinese, Persian, the modern colloquial varieties of Arabic, Swahili, and Indonesian. He has outlined his ideas in academic format in Language Interrupted and Linguistic Simplicity and Complexity and, for the general public, in What Language Is and Our Magnificent Bastard Tongue. Some other linguists suggest that his notions of simplicity and complexity are impressionistic and grounded on comparisons with European languages, and they point to exceptions to his proposed correlations.

McWhorter is a vocal critic of the Sapir–Whorf hypothesis. In The Language Hoax, he outlines how, despite the fact language influences thought in an "infinitesimal way", and culture is expressed through language, language itself does not create different ways of thinking or determine world views.

McWhorter has also been a proponent of a theory that various languages on the island of Flores underwent transformation because of aggressive migrations from the nearby island of Sulawesi, and he has contended that English was influenced by the Celtic languages spoken by the indigenous population and which were then encountered by the Germanic invaders of Britain. He has also written various articles that argue that colloquial constructions, such as the modern uses of "like" and "totally", and other non-standard speech should be considered alternative renditions of English rather than degraded ones.

Regarding the various positions arising from the universal grammar debate, he describes himself as partial to the theoretical frameworks of Peter Culicover and Ray Jackendoff.

In January 2017, McWhorter was a speaker in the Linguistic Society of America's inaugural Public Lectures on Language series.

Language proficiency
McWhorter is proficient in French and Spanish, reads Russian well, and has some competence in several other languages.

Social and political views
McWhorter characterized himself as "a cranky liberal Democrat". In support of this description, he states that while he "disagree[s] sustainedly with many of the tenets of the Civil Rights orthodoxy", he also "supports Barack Obama, reviles the War on Drugs, supports gay marriage, never voted for George W. Bush and writes of Black English as coherent speech". McWhorter additionally notes that the conservative Manhattan Institute, for which he worked, "has always been hospitable to Democrats". McWhorter has criticized left-wing and activist educators in particular, such as Paulo Freire and Jonathan Kozol. He believes that affirmative action should be based on class rather than race. Political theorist Mark Satin identifies McWhorter as a radical centrist thinker. McWhorter is an atheist.

Views on racism
In a 2001 article, McWhorter wrote that black attitudes, rather than white racism, were what held African Americans back in the United States. According to McWhorter, "victimology, separatism, and anti-intellectualism underlie the general black community's response to all race-related issues", and "it's time for well-intentioned whites to stop pardoning as 'understandable' the worst of human nature whenever black people exhibit it".

In April 2015, McWhorter appeared on NPR and said that the use of the word "thug" was becoming code for "the N-word" or "black people ruining things" when used by whites in reference to criminal activity. He added that use by President Barack Obama and former Baltimore Mayor Stephanie Rawlings-Blake (for which she later apologized) could not be interpreted in the same way, given that the black community's use of "thug" may connote admiration for black self-direction and survival. McWhorter clarified his views in an article in The Washington Post.

McWhorter has posited that anti-racism has become as harmful in the United States as racism itself. 
McWhorter has criticized the term "microaggression", as well as what he regards as the overly casual conflation of racial bias with white supremacy. 
As early as December 2018, McWhorter described anti-racism as a "religious movement".

McWhorter has argued that software algorithms, by themselves, cannot be racist since, unlike humans, they lack intention. Rather, unless the human engineers behind a technological product intend for it to discriminate against black people, any unintentional bias should be seen as a software bug that needs to be fixed ("an obstacle to achievement") rather than an issue of racism.

McWhorter criticized Robin DiAngelo's 2018 book White Fragility following its resurgence in sales during the George Floyd protests beginning in May 2020, arguing that it "openly infantilized Black people" and "simply dehumanized us", and "does not see fit to address why all of this agonizing soul-searching [for residual racism by white people] is necessary to forging change in society. One might ask just how a people can be poised for making change when they have been taught that pretty much anything they say or think is racist and thus antithetical to the good."

In his 2021 book Woke Racism, McWhorter expands upon these viewpoints and argues that "third wave anti-racism" is a religion he terms "Electism" with white privilege as original sin. McWhorter likens the books White Fragility, How to Be an Antiracist and Between the World and Me to sacred religious texts. He argues that this hypothesized status as a religion explains the behavior of its adherents, whom he calls "the Elect". He advises that since the faith, being a faith, is not open to discussion, arguments with its adherents should be avoided in favor of pragmatic action against racism. McWhorter advocates three programs: ending the war on drugs, teaching reading by phonics to children lacking books at home, and free vocational education, promoting the idea that not everyone needs a four-year college education to succeed.

Personal life 
McWhorter has two daughters. He separated from his wife in 2019. He plays the piano and has appeared in musical theater productions.

Bibliography

 1997: Towards a New Model of Creole Genesis 
 1998: Word on the Street: Debunking the Myth of a "Pure" Standard English 
 2000: Spreading the Word: Language and Dialect in America 
 2000: The Missing Spanish Creoles: Recovering the Birth of Plantation Contact Languages 
 2000: Losing the Race: Self-Sabotage in Black America 
 2001: The Power of Babel: A Natural History of Language 
 2003: Authentically Black: Essays for the Black Silent Majority 
 2003: Doing Our Own Thing: The Degradation of Language and Music and Why We Should, Like, Care 
 2005: Defining Creole 
 2005: Winning the Race: Beyond the Crisis in Black America 
 2007: Language Interrupted: Signs of Non-Native Acquisition in Standard Language Grammars 
 2008: All About the Beat: Why Hip-Hop Can't Save Black America 
 2008: Our Magnificent Bastard Tongue: The Untold History of English 
 2011: Linguistic Simplicity and Complexity: Why Do Languages Undress? 
 2011: What Language Is: (And What It Isn't and What It Could Be) 
 2012: A Grammar of Saramaccan Creole (co-authored with Jeff Good) 
 2014: The Language Hoax: Why the World Looks the Same in Any Language 
 2016: Words on the Move: Why English Won't – and Can't – Sit Still (Like, Literally) 
 2017: Talking Back, Talking Black: Truths about America's Lingua Franca 
 2018: The Creole Debate 
 2021: Nine Nasty Words: English in the Gutter: Then, Now, and Forever 
 2021: Woke Racism: How a New Religion Has Betrayed Black America

References

External links
 
 McWhorter's blog at The New Republic

1965 births
Living people
20th-century African-American people
20th-century linguists
21st-century African-American people
21st-century linguists
African-American atheists
African-American non-fiction writers
African-American social scientists
American atheists
American non-fiction writers
American social scientists
American social sciences writers
Columbia University faculty
Cornell University faculty
Educators from Philadelphia
Friends Select School alumni
Linguists from the United States
Linguists of pidgins and creoles
Manhattan Institute for Policy Research
New York (state) Democrats
New York University alumni
Pennsylvania Democrats
Radical centrist writers
Rutgers University alumni
Stanford University alumni
University of California, Berkeley faculty
Writers from Philadelphia